Imperio de mentiras (English: Empire of Lies) is a Mexican telenovela that aired on Las Estrellas from 14 September 2020 to 17 January 2021. The series is produced by Giselle González for Televisa. It is an adaptation of the Turkish series Kara Para Aşk, and it stars Angelique Boyer alongside Andrés Palacios. The production of the series began on 2 March 2020 in Mexico City, Mexico and concluded on 21 November 2020.

Plot 
Elisa Cantú (Angelique Boyer) never imagined that, upon returning to Mexico from New York, where she resides, she would encounter an unexpected tragedy that changes her life. The night Elisa would celebrate her birthday, fate leads her to meet Leonardo Velasco (Andrés Palacios), a policeman in love with Julia (Jessica Decote), a teacher, to whom he was to marry. At the end of the evening, Leonardo receives an emergency call, in which the discovery of two bodies is reported, one of them is that of his fiancée, who lies next to the body of Augusto Cantú (Enrique Singer), millionaire businessman and father of Elisa. Elisa and Leonardo will come together to search for the truth of what happened.

Cast 
The main cast of the series was confirmed on 27 February 2020 through the People en Español website.

 Angelique Boyer as Elisa Cantú
 Andrés Palacios as Leonardo Velasco
 Alejandro Camacho as Eugenio Serrano
 Leticia Calderón as Victoria Robles de Cantú
 Susana González as Renata Cantú
 Patricia Reyes Spindola as Sara Rodríguez
 Hernán Mendoza as José Luis Velasco
 Iván Arana as Darío Ramírez "La Cobra"
 Alejandra Robles Gil as María José "Majo" Cantú
 Javier Jattin as Fabricio Serrano
 Michelle González as Fernanda Navarro
 Juan Martín Jáuregui as Marcelo Arizmendi
 Luz Ramos as Adriana
 Ricardo Reynaud as Mario
 Cecilia Toussaint as Nieves
 Pilar Ixquic Mata as Teresa
 Carlos Aragón as Gilberto
 Verónica Langer as Piedad
 Cristina Michaus
 Adalberto Parra as Justino
 Alicia Jaziz as Clara
 Assira Abbate as Leslie
 Sandra Kai as Sonia
 Iliana Fox as Cristina

Special guest stars 
 Enrique Singer as Augusto Cantú
 Jessica Decote as Julia

Ratings

Mexico ratings 
 
}}

U.S. ratings 
 
}}

Episodes

Notes

References

External links 
 

2020 telenovelas
2020 Mexican television series debuts
2021 Mexican television series endings
Televisa telenovelas
Mexican telenovelas
Mexican television series based on Turkish television series
Non-Turkish television series based on Turkish television series
Spanish-language telenovelas